1930 Academy Awards may refer to:

 2nd Academy Awards, the Academy Awards ceremony that took place April 3, 1930, honoring films released between August 1, 1928, and July 31, 1929
 3rd Academy Awards, the Academy Awards ceremony that took place November 5, 1930 honoring films released between August 1, 1929, and July 31, 1930
 4th Academy Awards, the Academy Awards ceremony that took place November 10, 1931 honoring films released between August 1, 1930, and July 31, 1931